Nathan Paul McGuinness is a creative director and visual effects supervisor. He was nominated for an Oscar for his work on the film Master and Commander: The Far Side of the World (2003) and won a BAFTA Award for his work on the film The Curious Case of Benjamin Button (2008).

Selected filmography

Black Hawk Down (2001)
Pearl Harbor (2001)
Planet of the Apes (2001)
Bad Boys II (2003)
Master and Commander: The Far Side of the World (2003)
X2: X-Men United (2003)
National Treasure (2004)
Charlie and the Chocolate Factory (2005)
King Kong (2005)
Pirates of the Caribbean: Dead Man's Chest (2006)
National Treasure: Book of Secrets (2007)
Pirates of the Caribbean: At World's End (2007)
Transformers (2007)
The Curious Case of Benjamin Button (2008)
The Taking of Pelham 1 2 3 (2009)
Terminator Salvation (2009)
Transformers: Revenge of the Fallen (2009)
The Sorcerer's Apprentice (2010)
Unstoppable (2010)
Battleship (2012)
Fast & Furious 6 (2013)
Transcendence (2014)

References

External links

Living people
Best Visual Effects BAFTA Award winners
Special effects people
Year of birth missing (living people)